The eighth season of the animated comedy series Bob's Burgers began airing on Fox in the United States on October 1, 2017, and concluded on May 20, 2018.

On October 7, 2015, the series was renewed for an eighth production cycle, which premiered during the eighth broadcast season. The first episode "Brunchsquatch" was created with over 60 artists who are fans of the show and features a number of animation styles.

The season features guest appearances from Adam Driver, Jack McBrayer, Thomas Middleditch and Fred Savage.

Episodes

References

External links
 Official website
 
 

2017 American television seasons
2018 American television seasons
Bob's Burgers seasons